Mayfair Hotel or May Fair Hotel may refer to:

 The May Fair Hotel, in London
 Mayfair Hotel (Searcy, Arkansas), on the National Register of Historic Places
 Mayfair Hotel (St. Louis, Missouri)